Osamu Hamanaka (濱中 治, born July 9, 1978, in Tanabe, Wakayama) is a former Japanese professional baseball player. Drafted by the Hanshin Tigers in Japan's Nippon Professional Baseball in 1996, Hamanaka spent 11 years with the club from 1997 to 2007. Following his time with Hanshin, Hamanaka spent three seasons with the Orix Buffaloes from 2008 to 2010 and one season with the Tokyo Yakult Swallows in 2011. In November 2014 it was announced that Hamanaka had signed a contract to return to Hanshin as a batting coach for the farm team.

References

1978 births
Living people
People from Tanabe, Wakayama
Baseball people from Wakayama Prefecture
Japanese baseball players
Nippon Professional Baseball outfielders
Hanshin Tigers players
Orix Buffaloes players
Tokyo Yakult Swallows players
Japanese baseball coaches
Nippon Professional Baseball coaches